MDMEOET, or 3,4-methylenedioxy-N-methoxyethylamphetamine, is a lesser-known psychedelic drug and a substituted amphetamine.  It is also the N-methoxyethyl analogue of MDA.  MDMEOET was first synthesized by Alexander Shulgin. In his book PiHKAL (Phenethylamines i Have Known And Loved), the minimum dosage is listed as 180 mg.  MDMEOET produces few to no effects. Very little data exists about the pharmacological properties, metabolism, and toxicity of MDMEOET.

Legality

United Kingdom
This substance is a Class A drug in the Drugs controlled by the UK Misuse of Drugs Act.

See also 

 Phenethylamine
 Psychedelics, dissociatives and deliriants

References

External links 
 MDMEOET entry in PiHKAL
 MDMEOET entry in PiHKAL • info

Substituted amphetamines
Benzodioxoles